Shi Guangsheng (born September 1939) is a politician of the People's Republic of China, and the former Minister of Foreign Trade and Economic Co-operation of China.

References 

1939 births
People's Republic of China politicians from Hebei
Living people
Beijing University of International Business and Economics alumni
Politicians from Qinhuangdao
Chinese Communist Party politicians from Hebei